The Vivian Infiltration Area is an environmentally significant hydrological infiltration complex in Whitchurch–Stouffville, Ontario, Canada. It is primarily a heavily wooded forest. The Vivian Infiltration Area "contributes groundwater to the Oak Ridges aquifer complex".

References

Whitchurch-Stouffville
Geography of the Regional Municipality of York
Natural areas in Ontario